Alcalá del Júcar is a municipality in Province of Albacete, Castile-La Mancha, Spain. It has a population of 1,442.

See also
Manchuela

References

External links 

 Alcalá del Júcar Town hall
 Alcalá del Júcar - Web de la Diputación
 Alcalá del Júcar - Useful, but no official, website of the village

Municipalities of the Province of Albacete
Bien de Interés Cultural landmarks in the Province of Albacete